Élan Club de Mitsoudjé is a football club from the Comoros based in Mitsoudjé.

Achievements
Comoros Premier League: 4
 1994–95, 1995–96, 2003–04, 2010.

Comoros Cup: 1
 2004–05.

Comoros Super Cup: 1
 2011.

Performance in CAF competitions
CAF Champions League: 1 appearance
2011 – Preliminary Round

CAF Confederation Cup: 1 appearance
2006 – Preliminary Round

Current Players

Football clubs in the Comoros
1962 establishments in the Comoros